The  is an automobile manufactured by Toyota for the Japanese market from 1992 to 2007. It replaced the Corona and Carina wagons, and was sold at Toyota Store and Toyopet Store locations in Japan. While the Caldina has never been officially exported by Toyota, its All-Trac 4WD capability and large capacity have made it a popular grey import in Australia, New Zealand, Russia and many South American countries. When it was discontinued in 2007, the T270 series Avensis wagon/estate assumed its market position.

According to Toyota, the name "Caldina" is inspired by the Italian (and English) adjective "cardinal", meaning "essential" or "fundamental".



First generation (T190; 1992) 

The first-generation Caldina is a 5-door wagon and commercial van version (1992–2002) of the Corona/Carina sedan in Japan. It became treated as a separate line, with a new emphasis on the passenger-oriented station wagon model as a response to the runaway success of the Subaru Legacy wagon in Japan. The wagon has independent strut rear suspension while the commercial wagon has semi-independent leaf springs. Van models' chassis numbers are in the 196-199 range and receive a "V" suffix, while the wagons are 190-195 and carry a "G" suffix. In January 1996, the Caldina underwent a very gentle facelift, including a new dashboard and a new grille. The new dashboard was the same design as installed in the simultaneously introduced Corona Premio (T210), enabling the fitment of a passenger airbag. At this time, the 1.8-litre engine was also changed over from the 4S to the lean-burn 7A engine.

The Field Hunter received an externally mounted spare wheel, which increased the overall length to the point that it was no longer classified as a "compact car", placing it in a much higher tax category. The popularity of the light commercial segment was waning at this time in Japan, with the Mark II van (X70) being discontinued without a direct successor in 1997, leaving only the Crown and Caldina Vans. While sales of the Caldina Wagon ended in September 1997, the Van continued to be sold until July 2002.

The Caldina Van received another light facelift in August 1999, which is also when the naturally aspirated diesel was upgraded to a 2.2-liter version (the turbo-diesel had only been available in the Caldina Wagon). ABS brakes were made standard, while crash protection was improved. The 2-liter 3S-FE gasoline engine also became available in the Caldina Van, only in combination with the electronically controlled four-speed automatic transmission (ECT) and four-wheel drive.

In Europe, the wagon was part of the Carina E family, while in New Zealand it was sold as the Corona. The vans were generally not exported. The 1.6-litre 4A engine (AT190) was only installed in export versions.

Second generation (T210; 1997) 

The second-generation Caldina is the Japanese version of the European Avensis wagon with door handles taken from the E110 series Corolla and the T210 series Corona Premio, launched in Japan in September 1997.

The four-wheel drive models are coded ST215, and were also offered as Active Sports GT models with the 3S-GE engine. The top-of-the-line GT-T came with the turbocharged  fourth-generation 3S-GTE engine, and included a four-wheel drive system similar to the Celica GT-Four. The GT-T also came with optional electronic stability control (standard on Active Sports versions). The Aerial version features a large sunroof and contoured roof racks as standard. Weighing , the manual Caldina GT-T has a  time of 6.4 seconds, with the automatic version only 0.1 seconds slower. A refresh was given in 2000 with new plastic bumpers and plastic headlights. The mostly-plastic interior was also updated. In 2001, an extra lug was added to the turbo manifold to prevent the manifold from warping which had been a common issue on GT-T models. Reliability of the GT-T engines proved to be a concern throughout the lifespan of the 3S powered GT-Ts, with spun main bearings and shattered oil pump gears being common issues amongst owners.

Engines for the more common lesser models are the 1.8 L 7A-FE petrol, the 2.0 L 3S-FE petrol and the 2.2 L 3C-TE turbo-diesel.

Third generation (T240; 2002) 

The third-generation Caldina launched in September 2002 was marketed as a pure sports wagon and does not share body panels with Allion, Premio and Avensis.

Engines for the Caldina are 1.8 L 1ZZ-FE, 2.0 L 1AZ-FSE and 2.0 L turbocharged 3S-GTE. Trim levels are 1.8 X, 1.8 Z, 2.0 Z, 2.0 ZT and GT-Four (the latter is coded ST246). All models have an automatic transmission and the GT-Four model only comes in a tiptronic transmission.

As a tribute to Toyota's motorsports development guru and the creator of the first GT-Four, Hiromu Naruse, a special edition Caldina GT-Four was produced, the Caldina GT-Four N Edition (N for Naruse). This model was equipped with several performance enhancements specified by Naruse:
 Sports ABS
 Improved shocks and altered spring ratings
 Front upper strut bar
 Torsen rear LSD
 Recaro front seats and interior trim

Production of the third-generation Caldina ended in mid-2007 without a direct successor, but is indirectly replaced with the T270 series Avensis wagon/estate imported from the UK.

References 

Caldina
Cars introduced in 1992
2000s cars
Compact cars
Station wagons
Front-wheel-drive vehicles
All-wheel-drive vehicles